St Spyridon College is a dual-campus independent Greek Orthodox primary and secondary school, in the eastern suburbs of Sydney, New South Wales, Australia.

Established in 1983, the College enrolled approximately 750 students in 2019, from Kindergarten to Year 12, of whom no students identified as Indigenous Australians and 83 percent were from a language background other than English. Administrative oversight of the school is managed by the St Spyridon Parish and Community of South East Sydney in accordance with a curriculum developed by the New South Wales Education Standards Authority.

The Head of College is Efrosini Stefanou-Haag. The principal of the high school campus is Amelia Katsogiannis and principal of the primary is Aristea Synesios.

See also 

List of non-government schools in New South Wales
Greek Orthodox Archdiocese of Australia

References

External links 
 

Private primary schools in Sydney
Eastern Orthodox schools in Australia
Educational institutions established in 1983
Junior School Heads Association of Australia Member Schools
Maroubra, New South Wales
City of Randwick
Private secondary schools in Sydney